The Tragedy of Romeo and Juliet is a 1982 film adaptation of William Shakespeare's Romeo and Juliet, directed by William Woodman and starring Alex Hyde-White as Romeo and Blanche Baker as Juliet.

Premise 
Romeo and Juliet's families have been in a feud that causes these two lovers to make decisions that change lives forever. The story ends with the two lovers committing suicide.

Cast

Alex Hyde-White as Romeo
Blanche Baker as Juliet
Esther Rolle as Nurse
Dan Hamilton as Mercutio
William H. Bassett as Prince Escalus
Dan Mason as Montague
Kate Fitzmaurice as Lady Montague
Peter Maclean as Capulet
Penelope Windust as Lady Capulet
Norman Snow as Tybalt
Marco Barricelli as Paris
Fredric Lehne as Benvolio
Alvah Stanley as Friar Laurence

References

External links 
 

1982 films
American drama films
1982 drama films
Films based on Romeo and Juliet
1980s English-language films
1980s American films